XERVON GmbH is a multinational company specialized in providing technical services for building and maintaining industrial facilities as well as for a wide range of construction projects, with headquarters in Cologne, Germany.

XERVON is represented throughout Germany besides having international branches and sister companies in Norway, Sweden, Austria, the Benelux, Poland, Slovakia, Czech Republic, Egypt, UAE, Qatar, Saudi Arabia. Also, it used to operate in UK under the name of Xervon Palmers, however, the UK branch was sold to the Chester-based businessman Colin Butt.

It was part of ThyssenKrupp-AG but since 2011 XERVON belongs to the REMONDIS SE & Co. KG, which, in turn, is a part of the multinational RETHMANN AG & Co. KG group of companies.

History
XERVON's roots go back to the 1928 the founding year of the Ernst Peiniger GmbHin Essen, Germany which later was known as PeinigerRöRo Group.

ThyssenKrupp Xervon GmbH, headquartered in Gelsenkirchen, Germany, was formed as of October 1, 2005, through the merger of the internationally operating PeinigerRöRo Group and ThyssenKrupp Plant Services.

ThyssenKrupp Xervon GmbH acquired as of January 1, 2006, the German service companies of the Standardkessel Group from the Dutch finance holding company H.T.P Investments B.V. located at Venlo. ThyssenKrupp Xervon acquired LLS Standardkessel Service GmbH (LLS), Duisburg, Baumgarte Boiler Service GmbH (BSG), Bielefeld, (each 100 percent), and Siegfried Schlüssler Feuerungsbau GmbH (SSL), Bispingen (74 percent). Employing a staff of 340, the companies generated annual sales of around 90 million euros as of (2006).

Following the closing of the transaction on Wednesday, 30 November 2011, REMONDIS completed its purchase of the XERVON Group from ThyssenKrupp. XERVON is now a part of the REMONDIS Group, effective from 1 April 2011. The independence of the XERVON brand was unaffected by the purchase. The company run under the name XERVON GmbH within the REMONDIS Group.

The  XERVON Energy GmbH  was sold on August 1, 2012 to the  Hitachi Power Europe GmbH '(HPE).

Overview
With over 8,000 employees and a turnover of 750 million EURO as of 2011, the Cologne-Based XERVON Group is one of the world’s leading companies providing technical services in the area of constructing and maintaining industrial plants. As of 2011 XERVON ranked number 3 in Germany in the field of industrial repair and maintenance.

References

External links
 

Companies based in Cologne
Property management companies